Simone Balocchi (Casalmaggiore, 26 July 1994) is an Italian rugby union player.
His usual position is as a Wing and he currently plays for Barbari del Po.

Under contract with Colorno, for 2016–17 Pro12 season, he named like Additional Player for Zebre in Pro 14.
From 2020 to 2022 he played for Colorno in Top12. 

In 2014 Balocchi was named in the Italy Under 20 squad and in 2013 and 2018 he is part of Italy Sevens squad. 
In 2018, he was also named in the Emerging Italy squad for the World Rugby Nations Cup.

References

External links 
It's Rugby English Profile
ESPN Profile

People from Casalmaggiore
Italian rugby union players
1994 births
Living people
Rugby Colorno players
Rugby union wings
Sportspeople from the Province of Cremona
Rugby Calvisano players
Zebre Parma players
Italy international rugby sevens players